René Van Meenen (born 14 January 1931) is a Belgian professional racing cyclist. He won the Omloop Het Nieuwsblad in 1963.

References

External links
 
 

1931 births
Living people
Belgian male cyclists
Sportspeople from Ghent
Cyclists from East Flanders